Lactogal is a Portuguese food products company focused on dairy products, milk, fruit juice and mineral water. It is headquartered in Porto and is placed among the twenty largest agro-food European companies. It has major factories in Oliveira de Azeméis and Vila do Conde.

History
Lactogal was founded in 1996 by the fusion between the three largest Portuguese companies in the sector: AGROS – União das Cooperativas de Produtores de Leite Entre Douro e o Minho e Trás-os-Montes, UCRL (headquartered in Espaço Agros in Póvoa de Varzim; founded in 1949); LACTICOOP – União das Cooperativas de Produtores de Leite entre Douro e Mondego, UCRL (headquartered in Aveiro; founded in 1962); and PROLEITE/MIMOSA S.A. (headquartered in Oliveira de Azeméis; founded in 1973). The company acquired the Spanish company Leche Celta in 2006, and in 2007, Lactogal was planning to complete before 2010 a new factory in Oliveira de Azeméis. In March 2016, Lactogal along with Lactalis opened war against Galician producers of organic milk.

Factories in Portugal
 Tocha – milk collecting and juice
 Oliveira de Azeméis – yogurt, UHT milk, cream
 Vila do Conde – UHT milk, butter, cream and yogurt
 Sanfins (Sever do Vouga) – cheese
 Aviz – cheese, butter
 Leça – pasteurized milk
 Lousado – milk collecting that is stored in order to be sent to Vila do Conde's factory
 Macedo de Cavaleiros – UHT milk
 Azores – cheese

Brands
 Mimosa (diverse dairy food)
 Agros (diverse dairy food)
 Gresso (diverse dairy food)
 Vigor (diverse dairy food)
 Pleno (water with flavour)
 Matinal (diverse dairy food)
 Adágio (yogurt)
 Fresky (fruit juices)
 Águas Serra da Penha (mineral water)
 Primor (butter)
 Castelões (cheese)
 Serra Dourada (milk)
 Milhafre (milk and butter)
 Leche Celta (diverse dairy food)

See also
 List of food companies

References

External links
 Official website

Food and drink companies of Portugal
Agricultural organisations based in Portugal
Dairy products companies
Food manufacturers of Portugal
Companies based in Porto
Companies established in 1996
1996 establishments in Portugal
Portuguese brands
Manufacturing companies of Portugal